Dorothea Brandt (born 5 March 1984) is a German swimmer, who specialized in sprint freestyle and breaststroke events. She is a multiple-time German champion, a fourteen-time medalist at the European Short Course Swimming Championships, and a semi-finalist in the 50 m freestyle at the 2004 Summer Olympics in Athens. Brandt currently holds the short-course German record time of 23.74 seconds in the same discipline.

Swimming career
Brandt is a member of the swimming club SG Essen, in Essen Germany. She first appeared on the international scene, when she helped out the German team (led by Antje Buschschulte to take the bronze medal in the medley relay at the 2002 European Short Course Swimming Championships in Riesa.

Two years later, Brandt qualified for the women's 50 m freestyle, along with Olympic veteran Sandra Völker, at the 2004 Summer Olympics in Athens, by attaining an A-standard entry time of 25.40 seconds from the German Olympic trials. Brandt, however, failed to advance into the final, as she recorded the slowest phase time of 25.83 seconds in the semi-finals.

Between 2004 and 2008, Brandt had won a total of seven medals (four silver and three bronze), as a member of the German team, in the women's freestyle and medley relays at the European Short Course Swimming Championships. At the 2009 Summer Universiade in Belgrade, Serbia, Brandt claimed her first ever silver medal in the 50 m freestyle, by seven-hundredths of a second (0.07) ahead of U.S. swimmer Michelle King, with a time of 25.03 seconds. On the same year, Brandt earned her second individual career medal, a bronze, in the same event at the European Short Course Swimming Championships in Istanbul, Turkey, with a time of 23.74 seconds. Moreover, she lowered Britta Steffen's short-course German record of 23.80, set in 2007, by a six-hundredth margin (0.06).

At the 2010 European Short Course Swimming Championships in Eindhoven, Netherlands, Brandt claimed her first title in the 50 m breaststroke by five hundredths of a second (0.05) behind second-place finisher Moniek Nijhuis of the Netherlands, with a time of 30.40 seconds. The following year, she captured a silver medal by eleven-hundredths of a second (0.11) behind Russia's Valentina Artemyeva in the same event at the European Short Course Swimming Championships, lowering her time to 30.17 seconds. Brandt also won a gold, as a member of the German swimming team, in the women's 4×50 m freestyle relay, clocking at 1:37.29.

References

External links
  
 
 
 

1984 births
Living people
People from Bremervörde
German female swimmers
Olympic swimmers of Germany
Swimmers at the 2004 Summer Olympics
Swimmers at the 2016 Summer Olympics
German female freestyle swimmers
German female breaststroke swimmers
Universiade medalists in swimming
Sportspeople from Lower Saxony
Universiade silver medalists for Germany
Medalists at the 2009 Summer Universiade